Gymnopilus lacticolor is a species of mushroom in the family Hymenogastraceae.

See also

List of Gymnopilus species

External links
Gymnopilus lacticolor at Index Fungorum

lacticolor
Fungi of North America
Taxa named by William Alphonso Murrill